The Rijeka Thermal Power Station (TE Rijeka, also known as TE Urinj) is an oil-fired power station east of Rijeka at Kostrena, Croatia. It was built between 1974 and 1978 and it has one generation unit with capacity of 320 MW.

Turbine for the power station was supplied by Ansaldo Energia. Ansaldo Energia was also awarded engineering, procurement and construction contract. Boilers were supplied by Waagner-Biro.

The power station is owned and operated by Hrvatska elektroprivreda. Its annual production varies, averaging 917 GWh, but only 141 GWh in 2011. It is expected to undergo decommissioning in 2020, but it is doubtful that it will remain operational until then because of its pollution problem. , Rijeka Thermal Power Station is offline, ready to resume generation within 160 hours of notice. On 18 October 2022, it was unofficially reported that HEP plans to restart the operation of the power plant in order to cover the losses incurred during the energy crisis.

References

Oil-fired power stations in Croatia
Energy infrastructure completed in 1978
Buildings and structures in Primorje-Gorski Kotar County